Gmina Szydłowo may refer to either of the following rural administrative districts in Poland:
Gmina Szydłowo, Masovian Voivodeship
Gmina Szydłowo, Greater Poland Voivodeship